is a retired Japanese professional shogi player ranked 9-dan. He is a former Kisei title holder and also a former senior managing director of the Japan Shogi Association.

Early life
Tanaka was born on April 29, 1957, in Toyonaka, Osaka. In 1971, he entered the Japan Shogi Association's apprentice school at the rank of 6-kyū under guidance of shogi professional . He was promoted to the 1-dan in May 1974, and obtained professional status and the rank of 4-dan in June 1976.

Shogi professional
Tanaka's first championship as a professional came in 1981 when he defeated  to 2 games to none to win the 12th . He also won the 1st  (1982), the 5th  (1982), the 34th NHK Cup (1984), the 17th  (1984) and the 20th  (1986).

Tanaka's first appearance in a major title match came in the Spring of 1988 when he challenged Yoshikazu Minami for the 52nd Kisei title; Tanaka won the match 3 games to 2 for his only major title. The following autumn he was unable to defend his title against Makoto Nakahara, losing the 53rd Kisei title match by the same score.

Tanaka retired from professional shogi on April 15, 2022. He finished his career with a record of 794 wins and 783 losses.

JSA director
Tanaka has served on the Japan Shogi Association's board of directors on multiple occasions. He was first elected as an executive director at the association's 56th General Meeting for a two-year term on May 26, 2005, and then re-elected to the same position in May 2007 and May 2011. He was re-elected as a director in December 2012, Tanaka was chosen to be the JSA's senior managing director to replace Koji Tanigawa after the latter was chosen to replace Kunio Yonenaga, who died earlier in the month, as president.

Shogi theoretical contributions
Tanaka earned the nickname "Edison of the opening", in reference to inventor Thomas Edison,  for his innovations in the opening part of the game.

He helped popularize the Bear-in-the-hole castle as a castle for Counter-Ranging Rook Static Rook positions. At the time, the Bear-in-the-hole was used primarily for Ranging Rook positions.

The diagram below shows Tanaka (Black) using Static Rook position with an Incomplete Bear-in-the-hole castle in an October 1976 professional match. His opponent Daigorō Satō (White) is using a Third File Rook (developed from an earlier Fourth File Rook position).

Promotion history
Tanaka's promotion history is as follows.

 1972: 6-kyū
 1974: 1-dan
 1976, June 4: 4-dan
 1981, April 1: 5-dan
 1982, April 1: 6-dan
 1983, April 1: 7-dan
 1984, April 1: 8-dan
 1994, December 16: 9-dan

Titles and other championships
Tanaka has appeared in major title matches twice and has won one title. In addition to major titles, Tanaka has won six other shogi championships during his career.

Awards and honors
Tanaka has received a number of Japan Shogi Association Annual Shogi Awards: "Best New Player"  (1976), "Most Consecutive Games Won" (1976), "Best Winning Percentage" (1978, 1980, 1981 and 1983), the "Techinique Award" (1978 and 1988), and the "Fighting-spirit Award" (1981 and 1983). He also received the association's "Shogi Honor Award" in 2000 in recognition of winning 600 official games as a professional and the "25 Years Service Award" in 2001 in recognition of being an active professional for twenty-five years.

References

External links
ShogiHub: Professional Player Info · Tanaka, Torahiko

1957 births
Japanese shogi players
Living people
Kisei (shogi)
Professional shogi players from Osaka Prefecture
People from Toyonaka, Osaka
Professional shogi players
Retired professional shogi players
Shinjin-Ō
Ginga